House of Secrets (1956) is a British crime film directed by Guy Green, filmed in Technicolor and VistaVision, and starring Michael Craig, Anton Diffring, and Gérard Oury.

Cast
 Michael Craig - Larry Ellis / Steve Chancellor
 Anton Diffring - Anton Lauderbach
 Gérard Oury - Julius Pindar
 Brenda De Banzie - Madame Isabella Ballu
 Geoffrey Keen - Colonel Burleigh, CIA
 David Kossoff - Henryk van de Heide, CIA
 Barbara Bates - Judy Anderson
 Alan Tilvern - Brandelli
 Julia Arnall - Diane Gilbert
 Gordon Tanner - Curtice
 Eugene Deckers - Vidal
 Eric Pohlmann - Gratz
 Jean Driant - Gratz's assistant (uncredited)
 Carl Jaffe - Walter Dorffman

Plot
The film, based on the novel Storm Over Paris by Sterling Noel, follows a man who is sent undercover to infiltrate an international crime organization planning to inundate the UK with huge amounts of near perfect forged UK Bank Notes to damage the UK Economy. In this very well-made Glossy Colourful British Film Michael Craig (Larry Ellis) is similar to an early James Bond character. The only thing which might spoil it for some viewers is the slightly abrupt ending. Beautifully photographed entirely in Paris, France.

Production
Michael Craig called his part "a sort of forerunner to the James Bond type of movie" which "in spite of all our best efforts it ended up being fairly boring." He was paid £30 a week.

References

External links

 

1956 films
1956 crime films
British crime films
1950s English-language films
Films shot at Pinewood Studios
Films directed by Guy Green
Films set in France
1950s British films